Pitardella is a genus of flowering plants belonging to the family Rubiaceae.

It is native to Himalaya, Cambodia, Nepal, Thailand in Indo-China.
 
The genus name of Pitardella is in honour of Charles-Joseph Marie Pitard (1873–1927), an English painter and illustrator. 
It was first described and published in Biogeographica (The Hague) Vol.79 on page 32 in 2003.

Known species
According to Kew:
Pitardella caudatifolia 
Pitardella poilanei 
Pitardella sikkimensis

References

Rubiaceae
Rubiaceae genera
Plants described in 2003
Flora of East Himalaya
Flora of Cambodia
Flora of Nepal
Flora of Thailand